Monument to Prince Volodymyr, is a monument in Kyiv, dedicated to the Grand Prince of Kyiv Volodymyr the Great, built in 1853. It is located on Volodymyrska Hill, the steep right bank of the Dnipro. It is the oldest sculptural monument, a dominating feature of the Dnipro banks, and one of the city's symbols.

Description
The brick pedestal and stylobate are revetted with cast iron plates.

Started by Vasily Demut-Malinovsky, the monument was finished by Peter Clodt von Jürgensburg in 1853.

Legacy

The monument is also depicted on Ukrainian karbovanets banknotes issued in 1993 to 1995.

Gallery

See also
 Christianization of Kievan Rus'
 Monument to Magdeburg Rights, also known as the Saint Volodymyr Lower Monument
 Statue of Saint Volodymyr, London
 Monument to Vladimir the Great (Moscow)

References

External links
 Monument to Prince Volodymyr at the Kyiv e-Encyclopedia

Buildings and structures completed in 1853
1850s establishments in Ukraine
1853 establishments in the Russian Empire
Buildings and structures in Kyiv
Cultural depictions of Vladimir the Great
Tourist attractions in Kyiv
Culture in Kyiv
Monuments and memorials in Kyiv
National Landmarks in Kyiv
Symbols of Kyiv